The 1959 Clemson Tigers football team was an American football team that represented Clemson College in the Atlantic Coast Conference (ACC) during the 1959 NCAA University Division football season. In its 20th season under head coach Frank Howard, the team compiled a 9–2 record (6–1 against conference opponents), won the ACC championship, was ranked No. 11 in the final AP and Coaches Polls, defeated TCU in the 1959 Bluebonnet Bowl, and outscored opponents by a total of 285 to 103. The team played its home games at Memorial Stadium in Clemson, South Carolina.

The annual game against South Carolina was played on Thursday at the South Carolina State Fair for the final time.  Clemson's 300th win came in the Bluebonnet Bowl against TCU.

Center Bill Thomas was the team captain. The team's statistical leaders included quarterback Harvey White with 770 passing yards, and fullback Doug Cline with 482 rushing yards, and halfback Bill Mathis with 70 points scored (11 touchdowns, 4 extra points).

Tackle Lou Cordileone was selected as a first-team All-American by Time magazine and a third-team All-American by the Associated Press (AP) and United Press International (UPI). Four Clemson players were selected as first-team players on the 1959 All-Atlantic Coast Conference football team: Cordileone; halfback Bill Mathis; end Gary Barnes; and center Paul Snyder.

Schedule

References

Clemson
Clemson Tigers football seasons
Atlantic Coast Conference football champion seasons
Bluebonnet Bowl champion seasons
Clemson Tigers football